Hidalgo Serra is a Spanish-Italian contemporary artist, actor, director, writer and music producer. He is the co-founder of Underdogs Animation Studio, and works there as a writer and director. Together with Gianfranco Bortolotti and Silver Pozzoli, he was in the band Club House, which had singles reaching the top charts. Also, he is the member of the Estonian Film Directors Guild. Currently, he lives in Rome, Italy, and is mainly focused on contemporary art.

Life and career 
Serra was born in Oviedo and has grew up between Italy and the United States, where he studied music at the Boston Berklee College of Music. He left the college after a few years to pursue the dream of becoming an actor. Prior to becoming an actor, he tried working in different fields, including composing soundtracks, producing dances, and writing and creating comic books which he did in New York City.

As a son of Enrico Serra, musician and orchestral composer, he began his career very early at the age of three, when he was introduced to some basic steps in music. During this period, he was offered a role in the movie Bim Bum Bam, directed by Aurelio Chiesa. After having some minor roles, he worked as a dance producer for five years. He also started DJing and he produced some remixes for artists Jimmy Somerville and Darlene Lewis. In 2009, he was involved in lot of different projects, ranging from Sanremo Music Festival to roles in TV fiction shows and sitcoms. During his career, he also worked as a model for Calvin Klein and Dolce & Gabbana.

From 2010, Serra is the director of the Underdogs Animation Studio, Estonian visual effects team established in 2007. Beside being the director, he is also involved in creative processes and he is one of the writers, producers and supervisors of the projects. One of the projects was creating 3D graphics for the movie Burn to Shine, directed by Marco Perego Saldana in 2016. Also, they worked with Ubisoft on creating some of the Far Cry 3 characters.

Music career 
During his music career Serra worked with the artists and bands, creating the music, lyrics and remixes for them. Some of the artists and band are: Mauro Picotto, Gigi D'Agostino, Leone di Lernia, Cappella, Jimmy Somerville, Darlene Lewis, Mig 29, and Sharada House Gang. He was also the member of Club House. Below are listed some of the songs and albums Serra worked on.

Filmography 
 Bim Bum Bam, directed by Aurelio Chiesa (1981)
 Il mio amore è scritto nel vento, directed by Cèsar loori (1987)
 La città prigioniera, directed by Umberto carpi (1990)
 Shade, directed by Nicolas louis (2003)
 Genoma, directed by Albert Roeg (2009)
 White Room, directed by Helger Raitzner (2009)

References

External links 
 
 
 

Living people
1980 births
Italian dance musicians
Musicians from Milan
Artists from Milan